Cléder is a commune in the Finistère department of Brittany in north-western France.

Population
Inhabitants of Cléder are called in French Clédérois.

Breton language
In 2008, 25.9% of primary-school children attended bilingual schools.

International relations
Cléder is twinned with Ashburton, Herleshausen and Taninges.

See also
Communes of the Finistère department

References

External links

Official website 

Mayors of Finistère Association  

Communes of Finistère